Even Azucena de Jesús Pizango Polocena (born 15 April 1995) is a Peruvian footballer who plays as a left back for Club Universitario de Deportes and the Peru women's national team.

International career
Pizango represented Peru at the 2012 South American U-17 Women's Championship. At senior level, she played the 2018 Copa América Femenina and the 2019 Pan American Games.

References

1995 births
Living people
Women's association football fullbacks
Women's association football midfielders
Peruvian women's footballers
Footballers from Lima
Peru women's international footballers
Pan American Games competitors for Peru
Footballers at the 2019 Pan American Games
Club Universitario de Deportes footballers
21st-century Peruvian women